Marysia Starosta (born 19 March 1981 in Warsaw), is a Polish singer. Her debut album titled Maryland was released on November 24, 2008 by EMI Music Poland. From 2011 she worked with her former partner, rapper Sokół with whom she released two albums, both certified Platinum in Poland.

Discography

Studio albums

Music videos

References

1980 births
Living people
Polish hip hop singers
Polish pop singers
Polish R&B singers
Polish soul singers
Women hip hop musicians
English-language singers from Poland
21st-century Polish singers
21st-century Polish women singers